Vileišis is a Lithuanian surname that may refer to:

 Jonas Vileišis (1872–1942), Lithuanian politician, diplomat, and lawyer
 Petras Vileišis (1851–1926), Lithuanian engineer and publisher
 Antanas Vileišis (1856–1919), Lithuanian doctor and activist
 Vileišis Palace, Neo-baroque style architectural ensemble in Vilnius, Lithuania

Lithuanian-language surnames